Extraliscio is an Italian folk band formed in 2014 and known for their style that combines traditional liscio ballroom dance with rock and punk music.

They debuted in 2016 with the album Canzoni da ballo. The band participated at the Sanremo Music Festival 2021 with the song "Bianca luce nera", featuring Davide Toffolo from Tre Allegri Ragazzi Morti.

Discography

Studio albums 
 Canzoni da ballo (2016)
 Imballabilissimi - Ballabilissimi (2017)
 Punk da balera (2020)
 È bello perdersi (2021)

Filmography 
 Extraliscio: Punk da balera, directed by Elisabetta Sgarbi (2020)

References

External links 
 

Musical groups established in 2014
Italian folk music groups
2014 establishments in Italy